This is a comprehensive list of awards received by Eminem, an American rapper, songwriter, and record producer. He began his career in 1996 with Web Entertainment and has been one of the most popular rap acts in the world since the late 1990s. Eminem is the best-selling artist of the decade on the US Nielsen SoundScan and has sold over 220 million records worldwide, making him one of the best-selling music artists of all time.

Eminem quickly gained popularity in 1999 with his major label debut album The Slim Shady LP, which won a Grammy Award for Best Rap Album. The following album, The Marshall Mathers LP, became the fastest-selling solo album in United States history.

The Marshall Mathers LP and his third studio album, The Eminem Show, won Grammy Awards, making Eminem the first artist to win Best Rap Album for three consecutive albums. He then won the award again in 2010 for his album Recovery, giving him a total of 15 Grammys in his career. In 2003, he won the Academy Award for Best Original Song and was nominated for a Golden Globe Award for Best Original Song for "Lose Yourself" from the film 8 Mile, in which he also played the lead role. "Lose Yourself" would go on to become the longest-running No. 1 hip hop single.

Eminem then went on hiatus after touring in 2005. He released his first album since 2004's Encore, titled Relapse, in May 2009. In 2010, he released his seventh album, Recovery. It became his sixth consecutive number-one album in the US and achieved international commercial success, topping the chart in several other countries. It stayed at number one on the US Billboard 200 chart for five consecutive weeks and a total of seven weeks. Recovery was also reported by Billboard to be the best-selling album of 2010, making Eminem the first artist in Nielsen SoundScan history to have two year-end best-selling albums.

Eminem was ranked 79th on the VH1 100 Greatest Artists of All Time. He was ranked 83rd on Rolling Stone magazine's list of the 100 Greatest Artists of All Time. He was also named the Best Rapper Alive by Vibe magazine in 2008. Including his work with D12 and Bad Meets Evil, Eminem has had 13 number-one albums on the Billboard Top 200, ten solo, two with D12, and one with Bad Meets Evil. In December 2009, he was named the Artist of the Decade by Billboard magazine. His albums, The Eminem Show, The Marshall Mathers LP, and Encore, ranked as the 3rd, 7th, and 40th best-selling albums of the 2000–09 decade by Billboard magazine. According to Billboard, Eminem has two of his albums among the top five highest selling albums of the 2000s decade. In the UK, Eminem has sold more than 13 million records. In 2010, MTV ranked Eminem as the 10th-biggest icon in pop music history. During 2010, Eminem's music generated 94 million streams, more than any other music artist.

In November at the 2013 MTV Europe Music Awards, Eminem became the first rapper to ever receive the global icon award due to his accomplishments and influences in music joining him with Queen, Whitney Houston and Bon Jovi.

As of early 2014, Eminem has sold more than 44 million track downloads and 44.91 million albums in the United States alone and became the second-best male selling artist in US history behind Garth Brooks. For the decade of 2010 through 2019 Eminem was Spotify's fifth-most-streamed artist (most-streamed male artist). In 2022, Eminem got into the Rock and Roll Hall Of Fame.

Awards and nominations

Notes

References

Eminem
Awards